The 1994 Little Rock mayoral election took place on November 8, 1994, to elect the Mayor of Little Rock, Arkansas. It saw the reelection of incumbent mayor Dalton J. "Jim" Dailey, Jr.

This was the first time that voters directly elected the mayor of Little Rock since the city had previously adopted a council–manager government style of government in 1957.

The election was officially nonpartisan.

If no candidate had received a majority of the vote in the initial round, a runoff election was held between the top-two finishers.

Results

References

Mayoral elections in Little Rock, Arkansas
1994 Arkansas elections
Little Rock